Anarta is a genus of moths of the family Noctuidae.

Species
 Anarta alta (Barnes & Benjamin, 1942)
 Anarta antica Smith, 1891
 Anarta arenbergeri
 Anarta chartaria (Grote, 1873)
 Anarta columbica (McDunnough, 1930)
 Anarta crotchii (Grote, 1880) (syn: Hadula chunka (Smith, 1910))
 Anarta decepta Grote, 1883 (syn: Anarta postica Smith, 1891)
 Anarta deserticola (Hampson, 1905)
 Anarta edwardsii Smith, 1888
 Anarta engedina
 Anarta farnhami (Grote, 1873)
 Anarta florida (Smith, 1900)
 Anarta fulgora (Barnes & McDunnough, 1918)
 Anarta fusculenta (Smith, 1891)
 Anarta hamata (McDunnough, 1930)
 Anarta inconcinna Smith, 1888 (=Anarta castrae (Barnes & McDunnough, 1912), Anarta ultra (Barnes & Benjamin, 1924), Anarta montanica (McDunnough, 1930))
 Anarta magna Barnes & Benjamin, 1924
 Anarta mausi Püngeler, 1904
 Anarta melaxantha Kollar, 1849
 Anarta mendax
 Anarta mendica
 Anarta mimuli Behr, 1885
 Anarta mutata (Dod, 1913)
 Anarta myrtilli – beautiful yellow underwing (Linnaeus, 1761)
 Anarta nigrolunata Packard, 1867 (sometimes placed in the genus Hadula)
 Anarta oaklandiae (McDunnough, 1937)
 Anarta obesula (Smith, 1904) (=Anarta subalbida (Barnes & Benjamin, 1924))
 Anarta oregonica (Grote, 1881)
 Anarta perpusilla Boisduval, 1829
 Anarta projecta (McDunnough, 1938)
 Anarta sabulorum
 Anarta stigmosa
 Anarta sierrae Barnes & McDunnough, 1916

References
 Anarta at Markku Savela's Lepidoptera and some other life forms
 Natural History Museum Lepidoptera genus database

 
Noctuoidea genera